Dixie is the second studio album by the punk rock band Avail. It was released in 1994 on Lookout! Records. The album was re-released in 2006 on Jade Tree Records. Also included on the re-released disc was the Attempt to Regress 7" and Live at the Kings Head Inn.

Track listing
All tracks by Avail

 "On the Nod" - 2:06
 "Clone" - 2:40
 "Tuning" - 2:42
 "Song" - 2:07
 "Sidewalk" - 1:55
 "25 Years" - 3:47
 "Virus" - 2:58
 "Beliefs Pile" - 3:05
 "Treading on Heels" - 3:00
 "Model" -  3:35
 "South Bound 95" - 1:42
 "Pink Houses" (John Mellencamp cover) - 3:18

2006 Re-Release Bonus Tracks
<li> "Connection"
<li> "Mr. Morgan"
<li> "Sidewalk"
<li> "Stride"
<li> "Song"
<li> "Observations"
<li> "Predictible"
<li> "Forgotten" 
<li> "Pinned Up"
<li> "Kiss Off"
<li> "Connection"

References

Avail albums
1994 albums
Lookout! Records albums